Nehawka is a village in Cass County, Nebraska, United States. The population was 204 at the 2010 census.

History
The first permanent settlement at Nehawka was made in 1855. Nehawka was platted in 1887 when a new railroad line was extended to that point. Nehawka is derived from an Omaha and Otoe Indian name meaning "rustling water".

Geography
Nehawka is located at  (40.829766, -95.991002).

Demographics

2010 census
As of the census of 2010, there were 204 people, 83 households, and 56 families living in the village. The racial makeup of the village was 99.0% White, 0.5% Native American, and 0.5% from two or more races. Hispanic or Latino of any race were 2.0% of the population.

There were 83 households, of which 32.5% had children under the age of 18 living with them, 57.8% were married couples living together, 6.0% had a female householder with no husband present, 3.6% had a male householder with no wife present, and 32.5% were non-families. 24.1% of all households were made up of individuals, and 13.2% had someone living alone who was 65 years of age or older. The average household size was 2.46 and the average family size was 2.91.

The median age in the village was 41.6 years. 24.5% of residents were under the age of 18; 7.5% were between the ages of 18 and 24; 23.6% were from 25 to 44; 28.5% were from 45 to 64; and 16.2% were 65 years of age or older. The gender makeup of the village was 48.5% male and 51.5% female.

2000 census
As of the census of 2000, there were 232 people, 92 households, and 63 families living in the village. The population density was 1,028.6 people per square mile (389.5/km2). There were 102 housing units at an average density of 452.2 per square mile (171.2/km2). The racial makeup of the village was 96.12% White, 0.86% Native American, 0.43% from other races, and 2.59% from two or more races. Hispanic or Latino of any race were 1.72% of the population.

There were 92 households, out of which 32.6% had children under the age of 18 living with them, 57.6% were married couples living together, 8.7% had a female householder with no husband present, and 31.5% were non-families. 25.0% of all households were made up of individuals, and 14.1% had someone living alone who was 65 years of age or older. The average household size was 2.52 and the average family size was 3.08.

In the village, the population was spread out, with 29.3% under the age of 18, 4.7% from 18 to 24, 26.3% from 25 to 44, 25.4% from 45 to 64, and 14.2% who were 65 years of age or older. The median age was 37 years. For every 100 females, there were 84.1 males. For every 100 females age 18 and over, there were 84.3 males.

As of 2000 the median income for a household in the village was $40,875, and the median income for a family was $52,500. Males had a median income of $35,000 versus $21,750 for females. The per capita income for the village was $17,143. About 3.2% of families and 5.3% of the population were below the poverty line, including none of those under the age of eighteen and 13.8% of those 65 or over.

Notable people
 Ernest M. Pollard, Congressman
 George L. Sheldon, 14th governor of Nebraska

References

Villages in Cass County, Nebraska
Villages in Nebraska
Populated places established in 1887
1887 establishments in Nebraska